Wize technology is a low-power wide-area network technology using the 169 MHz radio frequency. It was created by the Wize Alliance in 2017. Derived from the European Standard Wireless M-Bus, it has mainly been used by utility companies for smart metering infrastructures (AMI) for gas, water and electricity but is equally open to other applications in industry and 'Smart City' spaces.

History

169 MHz radio frequency spectrum 
The 169 MHz radio frequency band (169.4 - 169.8125 MHz more precisely), formerly known as ERMES band, was historically used by pager type services.

When this service ended, the European Conference of Postal and Telecommunications Administrations (CEPT) and its Electronic Communications Committee (ECC) decided in 2005 to allocate this frequency for a number of new use cases, including remote meter reading. The low value of the frequency, as well as the potential to transmit at up to 500 mW, makes this band a high-performance technical solution for remote meter reading taking into account the difficult radio access conditions (e.g. deep inside a building) and the necessity to be battery-powered for a long period of time (up to 20 years).

The ISM 169 MHz radio frequency spectrum is open and royalty-free in Europe, working as a license-free band for Short-range devices, with the common spectrum occupancy restrictions these shared spectrum have.

In 2005, Suez, a private water utility, developed an AMI infrastructure based on the 169 MHz frequency to run smart water metering deployments across Europe, mainly in France, Spain and Portugal.

In 2011, Malta's Water Services Corporation (WSC) adopted the 169 MHz frequency band for its smart water metering project, becoming the first country in the world to build a nationwide smart grid within a fully integrated water system.

The EN13757 standard communication system 
The EN13757-4 European standard is part of a metering standard suite managed by the CEN TC294 technical committee. The CEN TC294 standardizes communication for gas, water and heat meters as well as for heat cost allocators. EN13757-4 defines the wireless low level interface of this standard, including physical and MAC layers. This standard includes a long list of variants.

In 2012, the emergence of the EN13757-4/N2 variant within the CEN TC294 technical committee constituted a turning point.

The EN13757-4 mode N is the physical layer of Wize technology. The application layer of the Wize protocol is referenced in the EN13757 standard family and a liaison between the Wize Alliance, created in 2018, and the CEN technical committee "TC294" was granted in 2018. The Wize protocol is now open for free access and other uses such as the Internet of Things.

Technical features

Channels 
The radio spectrum of the EN13757-4 mode N standard defines 6 channels within the VHF band (5 up and 1 down). The combination of a low channel bandwidth (12.5 kHz), high speed option using 4GFSK modulation, bidirectionality and a high transmission power (500 mW, +27 dBm) enables the technology to achieve high radio performance.

Range 
Per unit, the in situ coverage of Wize technology varies from 50 km outdoors, 10 km indoors and 2.5 km deep indoors.

Battery lifetime 
The small amount of communication per day (5 to 10) enables the power consumption to be very low. Small lithium batteries cells (AA, A or C) are enough to power the devices for 15–20 years for remote meter reading.

End-to-end security 
The communication between devices and gateways (link layer) is end-to-end encrypted using hash keys in AES-128 to secure the data.

Over-the-air (OTA) updates 
A protocol mechanism allows to schedule and perform, via broadcasting, an update of the devices' firmware over the air wirelessly.

Roll outs 
So far, more than 7 million smart meters are operated with the Wize protocol.

In France, GRDF took the decision in 2012 to develop gas meter solutions called Gazpar using Wize technology. The deployment of 11 million smart meters and ten thousand gateways started in 2016 and is expected to be completed by 2022. It is mainly an energy efficiency project dedicated to clients and collectivities, designed to:

 Increase customer satisfaction through daily and automatic remote reading of gas consumption measures
 Develop energy savings by making consumption data available to clients.
 Optimize grid management and enhance performance of Distribution System Operators (DSOs), through more accurate knowledge of consumed volumes of gas.

By the end of October 2019, 4.5 million gas meters and 6,500 data-concentrators were installed in the field. GRDF intends to use its base infrastructure built on Wize technology for automatic and daily reading of industrial meters.

In 2018, the French local utility Régaz Bordeaux started a smart metering project with 250,000 gas meters.

The development of Wize 169 MHz infrastructures has also been undertaken in the water sector by the private utility Suez Eau France and other public water utilities such as Eau de Paris.

Smart water meters have also been deployed with Wize technology by other European utilities such as Aigües de Barcelona in Spain and Ovak in the Czech Republic.

Wize Alliance 
Founded by Suez, GRDF and Sagemcom in March 2017, the Wize Alliance aims to promote and develop the use of the 169 MHz Wize protocol. The Wize Alliance is presided by Edouard Sauvage, CEO of GRDF (2016-2021). The board is constituted by the three founding members GRDF, Suez and Sagemcom.

Using the frequency 169 MHz is free by rights within the European Union, it is not mandatory to be part of the Wize Alliance to use the technology. However, only members of the Alliance have access to the technical specifications of Wize technology using the frequency 169 MHz.

References

Wide area networks